Located about 2300 miles (3680 km) from the nearest continental shore, the Hawaiian Islands are the most isolated group of islands on the planet.  The plant and animal life of the Hawaiian archipelago is the result of early, very infrequent colonizations of arriving species and the slow evolution of those species—in isolation from the rest of the world's flora and fauna—over a period of at least 5 million years. As a consequence, Hawai'i is home to a large number of endemic species.  The radiation of species described by Charles Darwin in the Galapagos Islands which was critical to the formulation of his theory of evolution is far exceeded in the more isolated Hawaiian Islands.

The relatively short time that the existing main islands of the archipelago have been above the surface of the ocean (less than 10 million years) is only a fraction of time span over which biological colonization and evolution have occurred in the archipelago.  High, volcanic islands have existed in the Pacific far longer, extending in a chain to the northwest; these once mountainous islands are now reduced to submerged banks and coral atolls. Midway Atoll, for example, formed as a volcanic island some 28 million years ago. Kure Atoll, a little further to the northwest, is near the Darwin point—defined as waters of a temperature that allows coral reef development to just keep up with isostatic sinking. And extending back in time before Kure, an even older chain of islands spreads northward nearly to the Aleutian Islands; these former islands, all north of the Darwin point, are now completely submerged as the Emperor Seamounts.

The islands are well known for the environmental diversity that occurs on high mountains within a trade winds field. On a single island, the climate can differ around the coast from dry tropical (< 20 in or 500 mm annual rainfall) to wet tropical; and up the slopes from tropical rainforest (> 200 in or 5000 mm per year) through a temperate climate into alpine conditions of cold and dry climate.  The rainy climate impacts soil development, which largely determines ground permeability, which affects the distribution of streams, wetlands, and wet places.

The distance and remoteness of the Hawaiian archipelago is a biological filter.  Seeds or spores attached to a lost migrating bird's feather or an insect falling out of the high winds found a place to survive in the islands and whatever else was needed to reproduce.  The narrowing of the gene pool meant that at the very beginning, the population of a colonizing species was a bit different from that of the remote contributing population.

Island formation 
Throughout time, the Hawaiian Islands formed linearly from northwest to the southeast.  A study was conducted to determine the approximate ages of the Hawaiian Islands using K–Ar dating of the oldest found igneous rocks from each island.  Kauai was determined to be about 5.1 million years old, Oahu about 3.7 million years old and the youngest island of Hawaii about 0.43 million years old.  By determining the maximum age of the islands, inferences could be made about the maximum possible age of organisms inhabiting the island.  The newly formed islands were able to accommodate growing populations, while the new environments were causing high rates of new adaptations.

Human arrival 
Human contact, first by Polynesians and later by Europeans, has had a significant impact.  Both the Polynesians and Europeans cleared native forests and introduced non-indigenous species for agriculture (or by accident), driving many endemic species to extinction. Fossil finds in caves, lava tubes, and sand dunes have revealed an avifauna that once had a native eagle, two raven-size crows, several bird-eating owls, and giant ducks known as moa-nalos. Around 861 species of plants have been introduced to the islands by humans since its discovery by Polynesian settlers, including crops such as taro and breadfruit.

Today, many of the remaining endemic species of plants and animals in the Hawaiian Islands are considered endangered, and some critically so.  Plant species are particularly at risk: out of a total of 2,690 plant species, 946 are non-indigenous with 800 of the native species listed as endangered.

Terrestrial animals

Mammals
 Hawaiian hoary bat (a.k.a. ʻŌpeʻapeʻa) (Lasiurus semotus) - endangered
 Hawaiian monk seal (a.k.a. ʻIlio-holo-i-ka-uaua) (Neomonachus schauinslandi) - endangered
 Synemporion keana (a species of vesper bat) - extinct

Birds
 Hawaiian duck (a.k.a. Koloa) (Anas wyvilliana) - endangered
 Laysan duck (Anas laysanensis) - critically endangered
 Nene (a.k.a. Hawaiian goose) (Branta sandvicensis) - near threatened
 Hawaiian petrel (Pterodroma sandwichensis) - endangered
 Newell's shearwater (a.k.a. Hawaiian shearwater or 'a'o) (Puffinus newelli) - critically endangered
 Hawaiian hawk (a.k.a. 'Io) (Buteo solitarius) - near threatened
 Laysan rail (Porzana palmeri) - extinct
 Hawaiian rail (Porzana sandwichensis) - extinct
 Hawaiian gallinule (Gallinula chloropus sanvicensis)
 Hawaiian coot (Fulica alai) - vulnerable
 Hawaiian stilt (Himantopus himantopus knudseni)
 Hawaiian black noddy (Anous minutus melanogenys)
 Pueo (Asio flammeus sandwichensis) - endangered
 Kauaʻi oʻo (Moho braccatus) - extinct
 Oʻahu ʻōʻō (Moho apicalis) - extinct
 Molokaʻi ʻōʻō (Moho bishopi) - extinct
 Hawaiʻi ʻōʻō (Moho nobilis) - extinct
 Kioea (Chaetoptila angustipluma) - extinct
 Kāmaʻo (Myadestes myadestinus) - extinct
Puaiohi (Myadestes palmeri) - critically endangered
Olomaʻo (Myadestes lanaiensis) - critically endangered/extinct
ʻAmaui (Myadestes (lanaiensis) woahensis) - extinct
 ʻŌmaʻo (Myadestes obscurus) - vulnerable
 Millerbird (Acrocephalus familiaris) - critically endangered
 Hawaiʻi ʻelepaio (Chasiempis sandwichensis) - vulnerable
 Oʻahu ʻelepaio (Chasiempis ibidis) - endangered
 Kaua'i ʻelepaio (Chasiempis sclateri) - vulnerable
 Hawaiian crow (Corvus hawaiiensis) - extinct in the wild
 Laysan finch (Telespiza cantans) - vulnerable
 Nihoa finch (Telespiza ultima) - critically endangered
 Lesser koa finch (Rhodacanthus flaviceps) - extinct
 Greater koa finch (Rhodacanthus palmeri) - extinct
 Maui parrotbill (Pseudonestor xanthophrys) - critically endangered
 ʻŌʻū (Psittirostra psittacea) - critically endangered/extinct
 Palila (Loxioides bailleui) - critically endangered
 Lanaʻi hookbill (Dysmorodrepanis munroi) - extinct
 Kona grosbeak (Chlroidops kona) - extinct
 Common ʻamakihi (Hemignathus virens) - least concern
 Oʻahu ʻamakihi (Hemignathus flavus) - vulnerable
 Kauaʻi ʻamakihi (Hemignathus kauaiensis) - vulnerable
 Greater ʻamakihi (Hemignathus sagittirostris) - extinct
 Maui nukupuʻu (Hemignathus affinis) - critically endangered/extinct
 Kauaʻi nukupuʻu (Hemignathus hanapepe) - critically endangered/extinct
 Oʻahu nukupuʻu (Hemignathus lucidus) - extinct
 ʻAkiapolaʻau (Hemignathus munroi) - endangered
 ʻAnianiau (Magumma parva) - vulnerable
 Hawaiʻi ʻakialoa (Akialoa obscura) - extinct
 Kauaʻi ʻakialoa (Akialoa stejnegeri) - extinct
 Maui Nui ʻakialoa (Akialoa lanaiensis)- extinct
 Oahu ʻakialoa (Akialoa ellisiana) - extinct
 ʻAkekeʻe (Loxops caeruleirostris) - critically endangered
 Hawaiʻi ʻakepa (Loxops coccineus) - endangered
 Maui ʻakepa (Loxops ochraceus) - extinct
 Oʻahu ʻakepa (Loxops wolstenholmei) - extinct
 ʻAkikiki (Oreomystis bairdi) - critically endangered
 Hawaiʻi creeper (Oreomystis mana) - endangered
 Molokai creeper (Paroreomyza flammea) - extinct
 Oʻahu ʻalauahio (Paroreomyza maculata) - critically endangered/extinct
 Maui ʻalauahio (Paroreomyza montana) - endangered
 Lanaʻi ʻalauahio (Paroreomyza montana montana) - extinct
 ʻAkohekohe (a.k.a. Crested honeycreeper) (Palmeria dolei) - critically endangered
 Poʻouli (Melamprosops phaeosoma) - critically endangered/extinct
 ʻUla-ʻai-hawane (Ciridops anna) - extinct
 ʻIʻiwi (a.k.a. Scarlet honeycreeper) (Drepanis coccinea) - vulnerable
 Hawaiʻi mamo (Drepanis pacifica) - extinct
 Black mamo (Drepanis funerea) - extinct
 Laysan honeycreeper (Himantione fraithii) - extinct
 ʻApapane (Himantione sanguinea) - least concern

Freshwater fishes
 None of Hawaii's native fish are entirely restricted to freshwater (all are either anadromous, or also found in brackish and marine water in their adult stage).

 Oopu nakea (Awaous stamineus)
 Kuhlia xenura (a flagtail species)
 Oopu alamoo (Lentipes concolor) - data deficient
 Oʻopu naniha (Stenogobius hawaiiensis)
 Sandwich Island sleeper (Eleotris sandwicensis) - data deficient
 Stimpson's goby (Sicyopterus stimpsoni) - near threatened

Terrestrial invertebrates

Insects
 Hyposmocoma (a genus of moths, such as the snail-eating caterpillar)
 Paralopostega (a genus of moths)
 Mestolobes (a genus of moths)
 Orthomecyna (a genus of moths)
 Scotorythra (a genus of moths)
 Kamehameha butterfly (a.k.a. Pulelehua) (Vanessa tameamea)
 Green Hawaiian blue (Udara blackburnii)
 Longhead yellow-faced bee (a.k.a. the Hawaiian yellow-faced bee) (Hylaeus longiceps)
 Thaumatogryllus (a genus of crickets)
 Wēkiu bug (Nysius wekiuicola)
 Drosophila Sharpi (a rare species of fly)

Crustaceans
 Atyoida bisulcata (a freshwater shrimp)
 Halocaridina (a genus of marine and brackish water shrimp)
 Hawaiian river shrimp (Macrobrachium grandimanus)

Spiders
 Ariamnes makue (a spider)
 Happy face spider (Theridion grallator)
 Kauaʻi cave wolf spider (Adelocosa anops) - endangered
 Orsonwelles, a genus of 13 species, each endemic to a single island
 Nihoa (a genus of spiders)

Gastropods
Gastropods are snails.
 Oahu tree snails (Achatinella) - threatened, several already extinct
 Auriculella (a genus of land snails) - threatened, several already extinct
 Erinna (a genus of freshwater snails) - one vulnerable species, the other possibly extinct
 Gulickia alexandri (a land snail) - critically endangered
 Newcombia (a genus of land snails) - threatened, one already extinct
 Neritina granosa (a freshwater snail) - vulnerable
 Perdicella (a genus of land snails) - threatened, several already extinct

Marine animals

Marine fishes

Cnidarians
 Finger coral (Porites compressa)
 Thick finger coral (Porites duerdeni)
 Brigham's coral (Porites brighami)
 Molokaʻi cauliflower coral (Pocillopora molokensis)
 Irregular rice coral (Montipora dilatata)
 Blue rice coral (Montipora flabellata)
 Sandpaper or Ringed rice coral (Montipora patula)
 Verril's lump coral (Psammocora verrilli)
 Serpentine cup coral (Eguchipsammia serpentina)
 Grand black coral (Antipathes grandis)
 Bicolor gorgonian (Acabaria bicolor)
 Small knob leather coral (Sinularia molokaiensis)

Plants

Apiales 
Lapalapa (Cheirodendron platyphyllum)
ʻŌlapa (Cheirodendron trigynum)

Arecales 
Loulu – (Pritchardia fan palms)

Asparagales

Asparagaceae 
Golden hala pepe (Dracaena aurea)
Lanai hala pepe (Dracaena fernaldii)
Waianae Range hala pepe (Dracaena forbesii)
Royal hala pepe (Dracaena halapepe) 
Dracaena halemanuensis
Hawai'i hala pepe (Dracaena konaensis)
Maui hala pepe (Dracaena rockii)

Asteliaceae 
Astelia argyrocoma
Puaʻakuhinia (Astelia menziesiana) 
Pa'iniu (Astelia waialealae)

Orchidaceae 
Hawai'i jewel orchid (Anoectochilus sandvicensis)
Hawai'i widelip orchid (Liparis hawaiensis)
Hawai'i bog orchid (Peristylus holochila)

Asterales

Campanulaceae 
Alula (Brighamia insignis) - critically endangered
Lobelia niihauensis - endangered
Lobelia oahuensis - critically endangered
Clermontia pyrularia - critically endangered
Cyanea konahuanuiensis - critically endangered
Cyanea platyphylla - critically endangered
Cyanea superba - extinct in the wild
Cyanea truncata - critically endangered

Asteraceae 
Greensword (Argyroxiphium grayanum)
Hawaii silversword (Argyroxiphium sandwicense)
ʻEke silversword (Argyroxiphium caliginis)
Mauna Loa silversword (Argyroxiphium kauense)
Argyroxiphium virescens
Hawaiian iliau (Wilkesia gymnoxiphium)
Dwarf iliau (Wilkesia hobdyi)
Tree dubautia (Dubautia arborea)
Keaau Valley dubautia (Dubautia herbstobatae)
Bog dubautia (Dubautia imbricata)
Kalalau rim dubautia (Dubautia kenwoodii)
Small-headed dubautia (Dubautia microcephala)
Wahiawa bog dubautia (Dubautia pauciflorula)
Plantainleaf dubautia (Dubautia plantaginea)
Net-veined dubautia (Dubautia reticulata)
Wahiawa dubautia (Dubautia syndetica)
Waiʻaleʻale dubautia (Dubautia waialealae)
Koholapehu (Dubautia latifolia)
Dubautia kalalauensis

Cornales 
Kanawao (Broussaisia arguta)

Fabales 
Acacia koaia - vulnerable
 Māmane (Sophora chrysophylla)

Gentianales 
Na'u (Gardenia brighamii) - critically endangered
Pua ʻala (Brighamia rockii) - critically endangered

Malvales 
Abutilon eremitopetalum
Abutilon menziesii
Abutilon sandwicense
Gossypium tomentosum
Hibiscadelphus - endemic genus
Hibiscadelphus bombycinus
Hibiscadelphus crucibracteatus
Hibiscadelphus distans
Hibiscadelphus giffardianus
Hibiscadelphus hualalaiensis
Hibiscadelphus ×puakuahiwi
Hibiscadelphus wilderianus
Hibiscadelphus woodii
Hibiscus arnottianus
Yellow hibiscus (Hibiscus brackenridgei) - endangered
Hibiscus clayii
Hibiscus hannerae
Hibiscus immaculatus
Hibiscus kahilii
Hibiscus kokio
Hibiscus punaluuensis
Hibiscus saintjohnianus
Hibiscus waimeae
Kokia - endemic genus
Kokia cookei
Kokia drynarioides
Kokia kauaiensis
Waltheria pyrolifolia

Myrtales 
ʻŌhiʻa lehua (Metrosideros polymorpha)
Lehua mamo (Metrosideros macropus)
Lehua papa (Metrosideros rugosa)

Piperales 
Peperomia cookiana

Rosales 
ʻĀkala (Rubus hawaiensis)
ʻĀkalakala (Rubus macraei)

Fungi 
 Pholiota peleae
 Rhodocollybia laulaha
 Mycena marasmielloides

Hygrophoraceae

Hygrocybe 

 Glowing like the sun Hygrocybe lamalama
 Slippery like a fish Hygrocybe pakelo
 Pink rose in the mist or rain forest Hygrocybe noelokelani
 Hygrocybe hapuuae

See also 
 Canoe plants
 Endemic birds of Hawaii
 Environment of Hawaii
 Hawaiian lobelioids
 List of fishes of the Coral Sea
 List of fish of Hawaii
 List of extinct animals of the Hawaiian Islands
 List of Hawaii birds
 List of invasive plant species in Hawaii
 List of animal species introduced to the Hawaiian Islands
 Peripatric speciation on the Hawaiian archipelago

References

Further reading

External links
 Flora of the Hawaiian Islands from the Smithsonian Institution

 
 
Hawaii
Natural history of Hawaii
Insular ecology